The 18th Mountain Cavalry Division was formed in 1936 by renaming the 7th Tadzhik Mountain Cavalry Division in the Central Asia Military District.

Wartime Service

1941
At the beginning of war the division was one of the three Mountain Cavalry Divisions assigned to the 4th Cavalry Corps in Central Asia.  The division remained there until November when it was shipped forward to the Reserve of the Supreme High Command. The division was briefly in the reserves before being sent to the Kalinin Front's 30th Army.  Along with the other two cavalry divisions in the army they formed the 11th Cavalry Corps in January 1942.

Despite being at 1/3 its prewar strength the division jumped off against the German flank north of Moscow. From February until July 1942 the 11th Cavalry Corps along with the 39th Army defended a nearly encircled salient in the vicinity of Bely and Vyazma-Smolensk.  The Germans launched Operation Seydlitz on 2 July 1942 and eliminated the salient by the end of the month.  The division was officially disbanded on 22 July 1942.

Subordinate Units
36th Mountain Cavalry Regiment
46th Mountain Cavalry Regiment
97th Mountain Cavalry Regiment
33rd Tank Regiment

See also
 Cavalry Divisions of the Soviet Union 1917-1945

References

018
Military units and formations established in 1936
Military units and formations disestablished in 1942
018